was a regional ruler of Japan's Azuchi–Momoyama period through early Edo period. Heir to a long line of powerful daimyō in the Tōhoku region, he went on to found the modern-day city of Sendai. An outstanding tactician, he was made all the more iconic for his missing eye, as Masamune was often called dokuganryū (独眼竜), or the "One-Eyed Dragon of Ōshu".

As a legendary warrior and leader, Masamune is a character in a number of Japanese period dramas.

Early life and rise
Date Masamune was born as Bontenmaru (梵天丸) later Tojiro (藤次郎) the eldest son of Date Terumune, born in Yonezawa Castle (in modern Yamagata Prefecture). At the age of 14 in 1581, Masamune led his first campaign, helping his father fight the Sōma clan. In 1584, at the age of 17, Masamune succeeded his father, Terumune, who chose to retire from his position as daimyō. Masamune's army was recognized by its black armor and golden headgear.

Masamune is known for a few things that made him stand out from other daimyō of the time. In particular, his famous crescent-moon-bearing helmet won him a fearsome reputation. As a child, smallpox robbed him of sight in his right eye, though it is unclear exactly how he lost the organ entirely. Various theories behind the eye's condition exist. Some sources say he plucked out the eye himself when a senior member of the clan pointed out that an enemy could grab it in a fight. Others say that he had his trusted retainer Katakura Kojūrō gouge out the eye for him, making him the "One-Eyed Dragon" of Ōshu.

The Date clan had built alliances with neighboring clans through marriages over previous generations, but local disputes remained commonplace. Shortly after Masamune's succession in 1584, a Date retainer named Ōuchi Sadatsuna defected to the Ashina clan of the Aizu region. Masamune declared war on Ōuchi and the Ashina for this betrayal, and started a campaign to hunt down Sadatsuna. Formerly amicable alliances were cast aside as he began to attack and conquer the lands of Sadatsuna's allies in pursuit, even those of his kin in Mutsu and Dewa Provinces.

In the winter of 1585, one of these allies, Nihonmatsu Yoshitsugu felt defeat was approaching and chose to surrender to the Date instead. Masamune agreed to accept the surrender, but on the heavy condition that the Nihonmatsu give up most of their territory to the Date. This resulted in Yoshitsugu kidnapping Masamune's father Terumune during their meeting in Miyamori Castle, where Terumune was staying during the time. The incident ended with Terumune and Yoshitsugu killed as the fleeing Nihonmatsu party clashed with the pursuing Date troops near the Abukuma River.

Due to the death of Date Terumune by the hands of Nihonmatsu Yoshitsugu, Masamune swore vengeance. In January 1586, Masamune had his revenge by launching an attack against the Nihonmatsu at the Battle of Hitotoribashi.

Various records of the event exist, although they present different accounts of its circumstances.
The Date clan fought many battles with their neighbours afterwards, including the Battle of Koriyama in 1588, the Siege of Kurokawa and the Battle of Suriagehara in 1589. After defeating the Ashina clan, Masamune made Kurokawa Castle in Aizu domain his base of operations.

Service under Hideyoshi 
In 1590, Toyotomi Hideyoshi seized Odawara Castle and compelled the Tōhoku-region daimyō to participate in the campaign. Although Masamune refused Hideyoshi's demands at first, he had no real choice in the matter since Hideyoshi was the virtual ruler of Japan. Masamune still delayed, infuriating Hideyoshi. Expecting to be executed, Masamune, wearing his finest clothes and showing no fear, faced his angry overlord.  Not wanting further trouble, Hideyoshi spared his life, saying that "He could be of some use."

Being a major power in northern Japan, Masamune was naturally viewed with suspicion, as any potential rival would be viewed. Toyotomi Hideyoshi reduced the size of his land holdings after his tardiness in coming to the Siege of Odawara against Hōjō Ujimasa.

In 1591, Masamune forfeited the ancestral land of the Date Clan (present day Date City, Kawamata, Koori, and Kunimi) to Hideyoshi, causing widespread riots. He never regained the territory.

After he fought against Kunohe Rebellion, he was given Iwatesawa and the surrounding lands as his home domain. Masamune moved there, rebuilt the Iwadeyama Castle, renamed it Iwadeyama, and encouraged the growth of a town at its base. Masamune stayed at Iwadeyama for 13 years and turned the region into a major political and economic center.

He and his men served with distinction in the Hideyoshi Korean invasions In 1592–1598.

Service under Ieyasu 
In 1598, after Hideyoshi's death, Masamune began to support Tokugawa Ieyasu—apparently at the advice of Katakura Kojūrō. Tokugawa Ieyasu increased the size of his lands again, but was constantly suspicious of Masamune and his policies.
Although Tokugawa Ieyasu and other Date allies were always suspicious of him, Date Masamune for the most part served the Tokugawa loyally.

In 1600, under Tokugawa eastern army, he fought in Sekigahara Campaign
at Siege of Shiroishi and Siege of Hasedo. Later,
Tokugawa Ieyasu awarded Masamune the lordship of the huge and profitable Sendai Domain, which made Masamune one of Japan's most powerful daimyō. Tokugawa had promised Masamune a one-million koku domain, but, even after substantial improvements were made, the land only produced 640,000 koku, most of which was used to feed the Edo region.

In 1604, Masamune, accompanied by 52,000 vassals and their families, moved to what was then the small fishing village of Sendai. He left his fourth son, Date Muneyasu, to rule Iwadeyama. Masamune would turn Sendai into a large and prosperous city.

In 1614, he fought in the Osaka campaigns against Toyotomi Clan.

Later in 1616, when Tokugawa Ieyasu was on his deathbed, Masamune visited him and read him a piece of Zen poetry. Masamune was highly respected for his ethics; a still-quoted aphorism is, "Rectitude carried to excess hardens into stiffness; benevolence indulged beyond measure sinks into weakness."

Death
In 1636, Masamune died of a combination of esophageal cancer and peritonitis at the age of 68 years. He was returned to Sendai in the same daimyō procession as when he was alive. The bakufu gave approval for his eldest son, Date Tadamune, to inherit the Date clan territory.

Patron of culture and Christianity 

Masamune expanded trade in the northeastern Tōhoku region. Although initially faced with attacks by hostile clans, he managed to overcome them after a few defeats and eventually ruled one of the largest fiefdoms of the later Tokugawa shogunate. He built many palaces and worked on many projects to beautify the region. He is also known to have encouraged foreigners to come to his land. Even though he funded and promoted an envoy to establish relations with the Pope in Rome, he was likely motivated at least in part by a desire for foreign technology, similar to that of other lords, such as Oda Nobunaga.  Further, once Tokugawa Ieyasu outlawed Christianity, Masamune reversed his position, and though disliking it, let Ieyasu persecute Christians in his domain.  For 270 years, Tōhoku remained a place of tourism, trade, and prosperity. Matsushima, for instance, a series of tiny islands, was praised for its beauty and serenity by the wandering haiku poet Matsuo Bashō.

He showed sympathy for Christian missionaries and traders in Japan. In addition to allowing them to come and preach in his province, he also released the prisoner and missionary Padre Sotelo from the hands of Tokugawa Ieyasu. Date Masamune allowed Sotelo as well as other missionaries to practice their religion and win converts in Tōhoku.

Masamune notably funded and backed one of Japan's few journeys of far-flung diplomacy and exploration in this period. He ordered the building of the exploration ship San Juan Bautista, using foreign (European) ship-building techniques. He sent one of his retainers, Hasekura Tsunenaga, Sotelo, and an embassy numbering 180 on a successful voyage to establish relations with the Pope in Rome. This expedition visited such places as the Philippines, Mexico, Spain and Rome. Previously, Japanese lords had never funded this sort of venture, so it was probably the first successful voyage. At least five members of the expedition stayed in Coria (Seville) of Spain to avoid the persecution of Christians in Japan. 600 of their descendants, with the surname Japón (Japan), are now living in Spain.

When the Tokugawa government banned Christianity, Masamune had to obey the law. However, some sources suggest that Masamune's eldest daughter, Irohahime, was a Christian.

Family 

 Father: Date Terumune
 Mother: Yoshihime (1548–1623), daughter of Mogami Yoshimori the daimyō of Dewa Province
 Wife: Megohime, daughter of Tamura Kiyoaki owner of Miharu Castle in Miharu Domain, Mutsu Province
 Sibling: Date Masamichi
 Concubines:
 Īsaka no Tsubone (1569–1634)
 Shōkoin (1583–1656)
 Oyama no Kata (1587–1668)
 Shōgo'in (d. 1644)
 Okachi no Kata (d. 1669)
 Hosshōin (d. 1664)
 Shinzo no Kata (d. 1612)
 Prostitute: Kōnomae (1577–1641)
 Children:
 Date Hidemune by Shinzo no Kata
 Irohahime by Megohime
 Date Tadamune by Megohime
 Date Munekiyo (1600–1634) by Shinzo no Kata
 Date Muneyasu (1602–1639) by Shoukoin
 Date Munetsuna (1603–1618) by Megohime
 Date Munenobu (1603–1627) by Oyama no Kata
 Date Munetaka (1607–1626) by Oyama no Kata
 Mūhime by Oyama no Kata
 Takematsumaru by Megohime
 Date Munezane (1613–1665) by Shōgo'in
 Minehime (1616–1632) married Date Munesane by Okachi no kata
 Date Munekatsu (1621–1679) by Okachi no kata
 Sengikuhime (1626–1655) married Kyogoku Takakuni by Hossoin
 Tsuta married Harada Munesuke by Konomae
 Watari Munemoto (1600–1669) by Konomae

Others 
 Aunt: Onamihime (1541–1602) daughter of Date Harumune, sister of Date Terumune and owner of Sukagawa castle in Mutsu.
 Wet nurse (foster mother): Katakura Kita (1538–1610), half-sister of Katakura Kagetsuna and Oniniwa Tsunamoto also mentor of Kagetsuna and Masamune.

"Three Great Men" of Date clan
 Katakura Kagetsuna (片倉 景綱, 1557 – December 4, 1615) was a samurai of the Katakura clan, also known by his court title, Bichū no Kami (備中守), or more commonly, as Katakura Kojūrō.
 Date Shigezane (伊達 成実, 1568 – July 17, 1646). A senior retainer of the Date clan of Sendai, he was a cousin of Date Masamune and founder of the Watari-Date clan.
 Oniniwa Tsunamoto (鬼庭 綱元) (1549 – July 13, 1640). Deeply trusted by Masamune, he was made a senior retainer at the young age of 35.

Retainers
 Oniniwa Yoshinao
 Rusu Masakage
 Shiroishi Munezane
 Kokubu Morishige
 Yashiro Kageyori
 Tamura Kiyoaki
 Ōuchi Sadatsuna
 Hasekura Tsunenaga
 Katakura Shigenaga
 Inawashiro Morikuni

Date clan's prominent castles

 Yonezawa Castle: original base of power for the Date clan from 1548 and possibly Masamune's birthplace.
 Tateyama Castle: Date Terumune spent retired life in the castle. There is a possibility Date Masamune was born in Tateyama castle.
 Obama Castle: Masamune stayed in the castle from 1585 to 1586.
 Kurokawa Castle: original base of power for the Date clan from 1589 to 1591.
 Iwadeyama Castle: original base of power for the Date clan from 1591 to 1601.
 Aoba Castle:  original base of power for the Date clan from 1601.
 Wakabayashi Castle: Masamune's fortified residence but now Miyagi prison is on site, He spent most of his time in the castle after he reconstructed it in 1627.
 Nihonmatsu Castle: Katakura Kagetsuna, Date Shigezane
 Hachōme Castle: Date Sanemoto
 Matsumori Castle : Kokubu Morishige
 Fukushima Castle: Date Harumune
 Ōmori Castle: Date Sanemoto, Date Shigezane
 Shiroishi Castle: Katakura Kagetsuna
 Iwakiri Castle: Rusu Masakage
 Watari Castle: Watari Motomune, Katakura Kagetsuna

In popular culture 

Like many figures of the Sengoku period, Date Masamune has been featured in literature, film, manga, anime, video games, and other media. There are a few prominent and notable examples. In the Iver P. Cooper 1632 series book 1636: Seas of Fortune, Masamune is a prominent character in the short novel Rising Sun which is set in the North Pacific region focusing on Japan's expansion into North America.

Masamune is the protagonist of the anime series Masamune Datenicle, produced by the city of Date in collaboration with Fukushima Gainax in order to promote the city's historic connection to the Date Clan. In this series, he is depicted as a child taking on the role of leader of his clan for the first time. Previous leaders of the Date Clan manifest in order to help him prepare for his first battle.

In the video game series Samurai Warriors (Koei) Masamune Date is featured as a playable character. In his first appearance, he was a very young man and fought with dual wooden swords, later, his appearance was changed to be a bit older and his weapons were switched out for a more European style sword and a pair of pistols. He is also a prominent character in the Sengoku Basara series (Capcom), and has been featured in every major release, portrayed as a reckless, but astute general with a penchant for using humorous English verses, he is also notable for carrying six katanas, which he can equip as "dragon's claws", wielding them between his fingers, three in each hand.

The professional wrestling organization Osaka Pro Wrestling featured two wrestlers using the ring names Masamune and Hideyoshi, who together form the tag team "Sengoku".

In Oda Cinnamon Nobunaga, Masamune is reincarnated as a French bulldog nicknamed Boo in modern-day Japan.

In Ginga Densetsu Weed: Orion Masamune's dog version is the main antagonist. His father, Terumune and Kojuuruu also play roles in the comic.

In the popular Netflix miniseries Age of Samurai: Battle for Japan, Date Masamune is portrayed by actor Hideaki Itō.

In the video game Persona 5 Strikers (known as Persona 5 Scramble: The Phantom Strikers in Japan), Masamune is referenced multiple times upon the cast arriving in Sendai. The statue at Aobayama Park is visited immediately upon arriving in the city, and a shrine that appears similar to his gravesite also appears.

In the video game AI: The Somnium Files, the protagonist, Kaname Date, has his left eye removed prior to the game's story, which is likely a reference to Masamune, himself.

Ken Watanabe played the role of Date Masamune in the 1987 NHK Taiga drama Dokuganryū Masamune.

References

Further reading 
 Kobayashi Seiji 小林清治. Date Masamune 伊達政宗. Tokyo: Yoshikawa Kōbunkan 吉川弘文館, 1959.
 Meriwether, Colyer. (1893). "Life of Date Masamune," Transactions of the Asiatic Society of Japan, Vol. XXI.
 Tetsuo Owada小和田哲男. Date Masamune: shiden 伊達政宗: 史伝. Tokyo: Gakken 学研, 2000.
 Ken-ichi Sato 佐藤憲一. Date Masamune's letters 伊達政宗の手紙. Tokyo: Sinchosensho 新潮選書, 1995.
 Zelia Nuttall (1906). "The earliest historical relations between Mexico and Japan".

External links 

 The official website of the Date clan
 Zuihoden – The mausoleum of Date Masamune.  When he died, twenty of his followers killed themselves (committed junshi) to serve him in the next life. They lay in state at Zuihōden
 Aoba-jo (Sendai Castle) website 
 An example of Date-influenced architecture
 "TEN-CHI-JIN" General of UESUGI Clan NAOE KANETSUGU – (Japanese)-Kabuto(Samurai Helmet) Papercraft

1567 births
1636 deaths
Daimyo
Date clan
History of Christianity in Japan
Japanese politicians with disabilities
Sendai
Warlords
Deified Japanese people
People from Yamagata Prefecture